Rachid Aftouche (born November 2, 1933) was a professional Algerian footballer who played as a defender.

Honours
 Championnat National
 Winner: 1962-63

References

External links
Profile on Sebbar Kazeo.com

1933 births
Algerian footballers
Algeria international footballers
Footballers from Algiers
USM Alger players
MC Alger players
USMM Hadjout players
Living people
Association football defenders
21st-century Algerian people